Aviram Dahari (born 1963) is an Israeli politician and current mayor of the Israeli city of Kiryat Gat since 2003.

Biography
Dahari was born to a Yemenite-Jewish family. He is the father of five children. He is a software engineer with a master's degree in Industrial engineering from Ben-Gurion University of the Negev.

In the 2003 elections for mayor of Kiryat Gat was Dahari top independent movement as "Tadmit" and won the first round in 32% of the vote. In contrast, the mayor at the time Albert Erez, received 25%. In the second round won Dahari the cedar as a graph about 70% of the vote. In October 2013 was elected for another term as mayor of Kiryat Gat.

External links
 Aviram Dahari in the Kiryat Gat website

1963 births
Living people
Ben-Gurion University of the Negev alumni
Israeli people of Yemeni-Jewish descent
Jewish Israeli politicians
Mayors of places in Israel
People from Kiryat Gat
Israeli software engineers